PSR J0901–4046 is an ultra-long period pulsar. Its period, 75.9 seconds, is the longest for any known neutron star pulsar (some objects believed to be white dwarf pulsars, such as AR Scorpii, have longer periods). Its period is more than three times longer than that of PSR J0250+5854, the previous long period record-holder. The pulses are narrow; radio emission is seen from PSR J0901–4046 for only 0.5% of its rotation period.

PSR J0901–4046 was discovered serendipitously on September 27, 2020, by the MeerTRAP team, when a single pulse from it was noticed during MeerKAT observations of Vela X-1 (which is less than 1/4 degree away from PSR J0901–4046 on the sky). After that pulse was detected, further examination of the data revealed that 14 weaker pulses were present in the ~30 minute long data set, but they had been missed by the real-time detection software.  The deepest image of the MeerKAT field showed a diffuse shell-like structure that may be a supernova remnant associated with the birth of the neutron star.

PSR J0901–4046's period, combined with its period time derivative of 2.25×10−13 second/second, implies a characteristic age of 5.3 million years. The discovery of PSR J0901–4046 challenges the understanding of how neutron stars evolve.

See also 

 PSR J1748−2446ad, shortest period pulsar known

References

Vela (constellation)
Astronomical objects discovered in 2020
Pulsars